Rubber Hair is a studio album by Kramer and Daved Hild, released in March 1997 by Shimmy Disc. It included contributions by cellist Garo Yellin and actor Billy West, who played guitar on "Photograph" and "Rubber Hair".

Track listing

Personnel 
Adapted from Rubber Hair liner notes.
Daved Hild – vocals, drums, cover art
Kramer – instruments, production, engineering
Garo Yellin – cello
Billy West – guitar (1, 12)

Release history

References

External links 
 Rubber Hair at Discogs (list of releases)

1997 albums
Collaborative albums
Albums produced by Kramer (musician)
Kramer (musician) albums
Daved Hild albums
Shimmy Disc albums